The Guardians of Justice (a.k.a. Adi Shankar's The Guardians of Justice (Will Save You!)) is a Netflix Original live action/adult animated mixed media superhero television series created, directed, written, and executive produced by Adi Shankar. The series is a Bootleg Universe production and a satire of DC Comics and the Justice League starring WWE Hall of Famer Diamond Dallas Page as Knight Hawk, a parody of an older grizzled Batman. The series was released exclusively on Netflix on March 1, 2022, and marketed as "An Adi Shankar Experience."

Plot
After defeating Robo-Hitler and ending World War III, peace has been maintained on Earth for 40 years thanks to the alien superhero Marvelous Man (Will Yun Lee). In 1987, this peace is thrown into chaos with Marvelous Man's death. Marvelous Man's former lieutenant, Knight Hawk (Diamond Dallas Page), investigates his death with the help of the idealistic hero The Speed (Sharni Vinson) in order to prevent a nuclear war and World War IV from breaking out.

Cast
 Diamond Dallas Page as Knight Hawk (Batman)
 Sharni Vinson as The Speed (Flash)
 Will Yun Lee as Marvelous Man (Superman)
 RJ Mitte as Mind Master 
 Christopher Judge as President Nicholas E. Nukem 
 Jane Seymour as Addison Walker 
 Denise Richards as Laura Louis (Lois Lane)
 Hal Ozsan as Van Dawson 
 John Hennigan as Red Talon (Nightwing/Red Hood)
 Derek Mears as Awesome Man (Captain Marvel/SHAZAM)
 Andy Milonakis as Phil Hart 
 Brigitte Nielsen as Anubis Queen 
 Jackson Rathbone as Blue Scream (Black Canary)
 Tiffany Hines as Black Bow (Green Arrow)
 Kellan Lutz as King Tsunami (Aquaman)
 Zachery Ty Bryan as The President's Aide #1 
 Alyson Stoner as The President's Aide #2  
 Preeti Desai as Golden Goddess (Wonder Woman)
 Edi Gathegi as Mr. Smiles (The Joker)

Episodes

Production

Development
On July 29, 2015, HBO was set to develop "Adi Shankar's Gods And Secrets" with Adi Shankar writing, showrunning and directing the tragic superhero satire. On September 27, 2021, the series became “The Guardians of Justice” with Adi Shankar showrunning the hybrid-animation tragic superhero satire. On October 13, 2021, Shankar revealed that his vision included the use of multiple mediums and tones.

Casting Process
On July 29, 2015, Diamond Dallas Page, Jackson Rathbone, Kellan Lutz, Sharni Vinson and Andy Milonakis were cast in the series. On September 27, 2021, Hal Ozsan, Derek Mears, Christopher Judge, Brigitte Nielsen, RJ Mitte, and Zachery Ty Bryan were revealed to be in the series. 

Believing that most artists have a broader range of performance capability than the professional industry classifies them into, Shankar said he wanted to cast the series with an eclectic mix of actors to capture the feeling of the world coming together. Carmen Aiello was the casting director for the entire series and was later credited by Shankar as the first Inclusivity Advocate on a television series.

Animation
On September 27, 2021, Graham Hughes was revealed to be lead graphic designer of the series. On October 13, 2021, Shankar revealed the origin of the multiple mediums were used.

Release

Film Festivals
On October 12, 2021, the series played in competition at the prestigious Canneseries festival in France.

Reception
Paste wrote that if a viewer can handle the combination of tongue-in-cheek filmmaking and extreme gore, the show was "worth the watch" to see its mixed commentary on the rise of the superhero genre in popular culture.

Decider recommended the show with a "Stream It" rating, citing the show's "riot of visuals and breathless narrative.

Winteriscoming.net praised the show for its "inventive, creative, and fast-paced" approach.

Gamerant.com called it a "mixed-media experience that must be seen to be believed."

Comicon.com compared the show to early Hip Hop artists, saying "Just as graffiti will appear as vandalism to some and street art to others The Guardians of Justice will be a polarizing series"

SportsKeeda called it "refreshingly unique and made for the present-day audience."

MintLounge said of the show "Shankar has created something highly original out of something all too familiar."

ReadySteadyCut gave it four out of five stars, saying "Any even remotely geek-savvy viewer will delight in picking up every reference"

References

External links
 

2022 American television series debuts
2022 American television series endings
2020s American adult animated television series
2020s American animated comedy television series
2020s American satirical television series
2020s American superhero comedy television series
English-language Netflix original programming
American adult animated comedy television series
American adult animated superhero television series
Animated satirical television series
American television series with live action and animation
Animated television series by Netflix